The Henry-Dubray was a French automobile manufactured only in 1901.  A product of Paris, the 5 cv three-seater voiturette was known for its "softness in rolling".

References
 David Burgess Wise, The New Illustrated Encyclopedia of Automobiles

Defunct motor vehicle manufacturers of France